Laurens de Haan (born 15 January 1937) is a Dutch economist and Emeritus Professor of Probability and Mathematical Statistics at the Erasmus University Rotterdam, specializing in extreme value theory.

Biography 
Born in Rotterdam, De Haan received his MA in Mathematics from the University of Amsterdam in 1966, and his PhD in Mathematics in 1970 under supervision of Johannes Runnenburg for the thesis "On regular variation and sample extremes".

De Haan started his academic career in 1966 as researcher in probability and statistics at the Mathematisch Centrum, Amsterdam. In the year 1971–72 he was Visiting Assistant Professor at Stanford University. In 1977 he was appointed Professor of Probability and Mathematical Statistics at the Erasmus Universiteit, where he stayed until his retirement in 1998. From 1990 to 1992 he was Associate Dean of the School of Economics. From 2008 to 2011 he was part-time Professor of Statistics at the University of Tilburg.

In 1977 he was elected Fellow of the Institute of Mathematical Statistics (I.M.S.), and he was Guest Professor at Peking University in 1994. He was awarded a Doctor honoris causa from the Universidade de Lisboa in 2000 and the Medallion lecture at the I.M.S. annual meeting in Gothenburg in 2000.

Work

Overschrijdingslijnen project 
The "Overschrijdingslijnen" was a research project based on extreme-value analysis, meant to provide new standards for the Dutch sea defenses. It was commissioned by the Ministry of Public Works, starting in 1984 and finished in 1992.

In this joint project people participated from "Rijkswaterstaat", the Dutch government agency overseeing the sea defenses; the Royal Netherlands Meteorological service; and the CWI Centre for Mathematics and Computer Science in Amsterdam.

Neptune 
Neptune was a larger scale but similar project, sponsored by the European Union via the MAST program and in cooperation with BMT Port & Coastal Limited, Delft Hydraulics, Rijkswaterstaat, GKSS-Forschungszentrum Geest-hacht GmbH, University of Lancaster and University of East Anglia. Novel aspects are: firstly the wide-ranging set-up starting from climatological data going down to the water levels and movements near the British and Dutch coasts and secondly the higher-dimensional statistical set-up in the extreme-value analysis (1995-1997). Finished March 1997.

Other projects 
Other projects were initiated, such as: 
 NATO collaborative research grant (1991-1995) with Sidney Resnick, Cornell University. 
 European Union grant "Training through research" (cat. 40) in the "Training and Mobility of Researchers" program. University of Lisbon, January through June 1997.
 Extreme interest rates, a project for ING insurance company; jointly with H. Drees, Heidelberg (1999-2000).

Publications
De Haan published multiple books. A selection: 
 1970. On regular variation and its application to the weak convergence of sample extremes. Mathematical Centre tracts
 1979. A simple asymptotic estimate for the index of a stable distribution. Technical report. Dept. of Statistics, Colorado State University. 
 1987. Estimates of the rate of convergence for max-stable processes. Report Econometric Institute. 
 1987. On regular variation of probability densities. Report Econometric Institute
 2006. Extreme Value Theory: An Introduction. With Ana Ferreira. Springer Series in Operations Research and Financial Engineering.

References

External links
Official Website
Extremes day in Lisbon
Extremes Website

1937 births
Living people
20th-century Dutch mathematicians
Dutch economists
Probability theorists
University of Amsterdam alumni
Academic staff of the University of Amsterdam
Academic staff of Erasmus University Rotterdam
Mathematical statisticians
People from Rotterdam